The 1991 Tour de Suisse was the 55th edition of the Tour de Suisse cycle race and was held from 18 June to 28 June 1991. The race started in St. Gallen and finished in Zürich. The race was won by Luc Roosen of the Tulip team.

General classification

References

1991
Tour de Suisse